Colin Nelson (born 13 March 1938) was an English footballer who played for Sunderland as a full back.

Club career
He made his debut for Sunderland against Bristol City in a 4–1 on 25 October 1958 at Ashton Gate. In total he made 146 league appearances, scoring two goals at his time with the club from 1958 to 1964. He then moved to Mansfield Town, where he made 38 appearances without scoring from 1964 to 1966.

References

1938 births
Living people
English footballers
People from The Boldons
Footballers from Tyne and Wear
Association football fullbacks
Sunderland A.F.C. players
Mansfield Town F.C. players
English Football League players